Gammage can refer to:

 Johnny Gammage (died 1995), American motorist who died in police custody
 Grady Gammage (1892–1959), American university president
 Robert Gammage (born 1938), American politician
 The Gammage Cup, Newbery Honor-winning children's book
 Gammage Auditorium, building on the campus of Arizona State University named for Grady Gammage

See also
 Gamage, a surname